Morten Due Hjulmand (born 25 June 1999) is a Danish professional footballer who plays as a midfielder for  club Lecce.

Career

Admira Wacker
On 13 May 2018, Copenhagen announced, that they had sold Hjulmand to Admira Wacker from the Danish club's U-19 squad. Hjulmand had never played any official games for the first team of Copenhagen, but had been on training camps with them. He signed a contract until June 2022, starting from the beginning of the 2018–19 season.

Hjulmand played his first game for Admira on 20 July 2018 against SC Neusiedl am See 1919 in the Austrian Cup. The midfielder participated in all league games in the first half year at the club except for one game.

Lecce
On 16 January 2021, Hjulmand signed a four-year contract with Italian club Lecce, in the second-tier Serie B at the time.

References

External links
 

Living people
1999 births
People from Tårnby Municipality
Sportspeople from the Capital Region of Denmark
Danish men's footballers
Association football midfielders
Denmark youth international footballers
Denmark under-21 international footballers
FC Admira Wacker Mödling players
U.S. Lecce players
Austrian Football Bundesliga players
Serie A players
Serie B players
Danish expatriate men's footballers
Danish expatriate sportspeople in Austria
Expatriate footballers in Austria
Danish expatriate sportspeople in Italy
Expatriate footballers in Italy